Madgalena Toeters (born 28 April 1986) is a Dutch swimmer. She has an intellectual impairment and competes in the S14 disability class. At the 2010 IPC Swimming World Championships she came second in the 100 m breaststroke; she also won silver in this category at the 2012 London Paralympics and at the 2014 European Championships. She competed at the 2013 World Championships but did not win any medals.

References 

1986 births
Living people
Dutch female breaststroke swimmers
Medalists at the 2012 Summer Paralympics
Paralympic silver medalists for the Netherlands
Paralympic swimmers of the Netherlands
People from Pyrzyce
Swimmers at the 2012 Summer Paralympics
S14-classified Paralympic swimmers
Medalists at the World Para Swimming Championships
Medalists at the World Para Swimming European Championships
Paralympic medalists in swimming
20th-century Dutch women
21st-century Dutch women